The Shivneri Caves are artificial caves dug for Buddhist monks circa the 1st century CE. These are now famous tourist attractions located on Shivneri Hill, about 2 km Southwest of Junnar, India. Other caves around the city of Junnar are: Manmodi Caves, Lenyadri, and the Tulja Caves.

Description 
The Shivneri Buddhist caves are located near Shivneri Fort on the top of the hill, where Shivaji Maharaja was born. It is a group of 60 caves that were excavated in the first part of the 1st century CE. At the beginning of the 2nd century CE, these caves were a flourishing center of Buddhist activities. The caves are essentially made of viharas or small cells, but there are also chaityas. The caves are scattered on three sides of the west–east-south triangle formed by Shivneri Mountain.

The caves are scattered around the hill, and categorized into several groups: the East group (1, 2 and 3), the West group, and the South group. Among the most important caves, we can mention:
 Cave 26 – a two-story Vihara
 Cave of 45 – Known as "Bara-kotri", it has 12 cells for resident monks.

South Face: Great Chaitya (Cave 47) 
Cave 47 is on the south face of Shivneri. It is one of the most remarkable Chaityas of the group. Inside are two rounded pillars and tiered capitals, similar to those found in Nasik (Pandavleni Caves). The hall measures 9.9x6.5m, and has a height of 5.8m. The cave contains a very beautiful stūpa with a "rail pattern" at the top. It is surmounted by a parasol. The ceiling is painted in color, consisting of squares in which are concentric circles of color (orange, brown and white).

The chaitya has on its outer face the dedicatory inscription of a merchant:

Inscriptions by Yavanas 

Two Buddhist inscriptions made by Yavanas (Indo-Greeks) were found in Shivneri. They suggest the involvement of men of Greek descent with Buddhism in India, as well as the continued presence and gradual acculturation of the Greeks in India in the 1st century CE.

Yavana inscription of cave 54

The inscription starts with the Buddhist symbol of the swastika (non-inverted), just before the word "Yavanasa".

Yavana inscription of cave 67

 
On this second inscription, the Buddhist symbols of the triratna and of the swastika (reversed) are positioned on both sides of the first word "Yavanasa".

Other similar inscriptions mentioning donations from Yavanas have been found at Karla Caves, Pandavleni Caves, as well as Manmodi Caves.

References

Buddhist caves in India
Caves of Maharashtra
Indian rock-cut architecture
Former populated places in India
Buddhist pilgrimage sites in India
Buddhist monasteries in India
Buddhist temples in India
Architecture in India
Caves containing pictograms in India